The Pennsylvania Red Caps of New York were an independent baseball club that played in the Negro leagues during 12 seasons spanning 1916–1934.

The title of this team had little to do with the state of Pennsylvania, but it did have a close connection with the Pennsylvania Station in New York City. The designation of Red Caps derived from the fact that some of the team's players served as redcaps in the famed station.

The team was formed in 1916 by manager and owner "Handsome Bill" Egan, who was the stationmaster of the Thirty-Third Street Terminal (one block East of Penn Street Station in Manhattan) in New York City.

The Red Caps played intermittently and never operated in an official league, while playing from 1917 to 1918, in 1920, from 1925 through 1928, and finally from 1930 thru closing in 1934. Basically, this marginal team was composed of black college students who played baseball during the summer in order to earn money for tuition.

One of their most prominent players was Dick Seay, who played shortstop alongside second baseman Chino Smith. Both Seay and Smith went to play professionally for the Baltimore Black Sox and the Brooklyn Royal Giants, respectively, while a number of their teammates became doctors and lawyers.

In later years, the team played their games at Freeport Municipal Stadium in Long Island. Very little data and information were recorded regarding their win–loss record.

Noted players

Rosters

1917

1918

Sources
Martin, Alfred M.; Martin, Alfred T. (2008). The Negro Leagues in New Jersey : A History. Mcfarland & Co Inc.   
Riley, James (2002). The Biographical Encyclopedia of the Negro Baseball Leagues. Carroll & Graft.

References

External links
Baseball Reference – Independent Negro League Encyclopedia and History

Negro league baseball teams
Defunct baseball teams in New York (state)
Baseball teams disestablished in 1934
Baseball teams established in 1916